The 1914 New York state election was held on November 3, 1914, to elect the governor, the lieutenant governor, the Secretary of State, the state comptroller, the attorney general, the state treasurer, the state engineer, a U.S. Senator and a judge of the New York Court of Appeals, as well as all members of the New York State Assembly and the New York State Senate, and delegates-at-large to the New York State Constitutional Convention of 1915.

History
This was the first time that U.S. Senators from New York were elected by general ballot. Until 1911, the U.S. Senators had been elected by the New York State Legislature, but the lengthy stalemate between Tammany and a faction led by State Senator Franklin D. Roosevelt, who was decided to impede the election of William F. Sheehan or any other crony of Tammany boss Charles F. Murphy, led to a constitutional amendment. Since 1914, the U.S. Senators have been elected with the state officers on the state ticket, and selected in the party primaries.

The  Socialist state convention met on July 5 at Rochester, New York. They nominated Charles Edward Russell for U.S. Senator; Gustave Adolph Strebel for governor; Stephen J. Mahoney, of Buffalo, for lieutenant governor; Mrs. Florence C. Kitchelt, of Rochester, for secretary of state; Charles W. Noonan, of Schenectady, for comptroller; James C. Sheehan, of Albany, for treasurer; Frederick O. Haller, of Buffalo, for attorney general; Prof. Vladimir Karapetoff, of Cornell University, for state engineer; and Louis B. Boudin for the Court of Appeals.

The Prohibition State Committee met on August 15 at Syracuse, New York, and voted to nominate Ex-Governor William Sulzer for governor instead of the previously selected Charles E. Welch, who then ran for lieutenant governor.

This was the first state election at which the parties with "party status" - at this time, the Democratic, Republican and Progressive parties - were required to hold primary elections to nominate candidates for state offices. The primaries were held on September 28.

Republican primary

Democratic primary

Progressive primary

The other Progressive candidates were nominated unopposed.

The Socialist Labor ticket was filed with the Secretary of State on October 9, 1914. They nominated a full ticket.

Ex-Governor Sulzer's aim was to defeat Glynn whom he considered a back-stabber. For this purpose he organized the American Party, and accepted the nomination by the Prohibition Party. He also sought the nomination of the Progressive Party, but was defeated in their primary. The American Party Executive Committee also endorsed a full slate (Prohibitionists Welch and Clements; Progressives Call and Colby; Democrat Seabury; Charles Horowitz for comptroller; Charles Podsenick for attorney general; and Robert Butler for State Engineer) for the other offices, but did not file a petition to nominate them, so they did not appear on the ballot in the American column.

Result
Almost the whole Republican ticket was elected; only Justice Seabury managed to defeat the Republican candidate Emory A. Chase.

The incumbents Glynn, May, Sohmer, Parsons, Call and Bensel were defeated.

The Republican, Democratic, Independence League, Progressive, Socialist and Prohibition parties maintained automatic ballot access (necessary 10,000 votes for governor), the American Party attained it, and the Socialist Labor Party did not re-attain it.

34 Republicans and 17 Democrats were elected to a two-year term (1915–16) in the New York State Senate.

100 Republicans, 49 Democrats and one Progressive were elected for the session of 1915 to the New York State Assembly.

Obs.: 
The vote for governor defines the ballot access.
Numbers are total votes on all tickets for candidates who ran on more than one ticket, except for governor.
Glynn also polled 3,764 votes; and Sulzer 1,426; in the "no-party column," a blank space provided for write-in candidates.

Notes

Sources
Petitions for tickets: PETITIONS FILED IN ALBANY in NYT on September 9, 1914
The primary ballots: HENNESSY'S NAME LEADS in NYT on September 15, 1914
Result (parcial) of Primaries: VOTE FOR GOVERNOR AND SENATOR in NYT on September 29, 1914
The tickets, and sketches of candidates for Governor and Senator: FULL TICKETS OF THE PARTIES in NYT on October 25, 1914
Result (final) of Primaries: PRIMARY CALLED OUT HALF STATE VOTE in NYT on October 9, 1914
Result: WHITMAN WON BY 145,432 in NYT on December 5, 1914
Vote totals from New York Red Book 1915

See also
 New York gubernatorial elections

 
1914